For the magazine published from 1952 to 1978, see House & Home.

House and Home is an interiors magazine published by Dyflin publications in Dublin, Ireland. The magazine primarily covers the area of soft furnishings and also pays particular regards to upcoming and current trends in the interior design industry.

The magazine was established in 1996 and contains features such as "Design focus", "Real homes", "Best buys" and "Inspiring ideas". The publication is published 6 times per year and is distributed to retailers and subscribers in the North and South of Ireland, along with a small number of international readers.

External links
House and Home official site

Magazines published in Ireland
Magazines established in 1996
Bi-monthly magazines
Mass media in Dublin (city)